Charlene James is a British playwright and screenwriter. She won substantial acclaim for her play Cuttin' It, which addresses the issue of female genital mutilation in Britain, for which she won numerous awards.

Early life
James grew up in Birmingham, England. She became interested in acting as a child, and took acting classes at Stage2 in Birmingham. She went on to study acting at the Steppenwolf Theatre Company in Chicago before becoming interested in playwriting, and earned a place in the young writers' program at the Royal Court Theatre in London.

Career

Playwriting 
Her first play, Maybe Father, was short-listed for the Alfred Fagon Award in 2009, and received a reading at the Young Vic theatre in London. She took a post as writer-in-residence at the Birmingham Repertory Theatre in 2013, where she focused on writing about teen mental health. She wrote Tweet Tweet for on a commission the Birmingham Youth Rep in 2014. The one-act play addresses issues of teen suicide and the pressures of social media.

James came to greater public awareness with her 2014 play Cuttin' It. The play focuses on two teenage girls, both Somalis living in England, who have different perspectives on the practice of female genital mutilation (FGM). James was inspired to write the play after watching the documentary The Cruel Cut by filmmaker Leyla Hussein, and after learning that FGM is practiced in Britain. Cuttin' It earned James the George Devine Award, the Alfred Fagon Award, the Critics' Circle Theatre Award, the UK Theatre Award for Best New Play, and the Evening Standard Theatre Award for Most Promising Playwright . She was a finalist for the 2016-17 Susan Smith Blackburn Prize, also honoring Cuttin' It.

James' play Bricks and Pieces was commissioned and performed in 2016 by Tiata Fahodzi in collaboration with the Royal Academy of Dramatic Art. The play examines themes of family, loss, masculinity, as well as communication and its lack, and addresses the challenges of being a gay man from an African family in Britain.

Screenwriting 
She has written for the BBC's The Break and Sky's fantasy drama series A Discovery of Witches. In November 2019, James was announced as one of the writers for the twelfth series of Doctor Who, making her the second black writer on the television series, in its entire history, following Malorie Blackman the previous series. She co-wrote the seventh episode, Can You Hear Me? with showrunner Chris Chibnall. The episode dealt with mental health issues, including examining past trauma for companion Yazmin Khan (Mandip Gill). She would collaborate with Doctor Who alum Pete McTighe on his supernatural thriller series The Rising for Sky Max.

Plays 

 Maybe Father, 2009
Do You Wish to Continue?, [short play] 2012
 Lundun
 Dad(die), 2012
Jump! We'll Catch You, 2013
 Bacon
 Tweet Tweet, 2014
 Cuttin' It, 2014
 Bricks and Pieces, 2016
 Go Home, [short play, published in The Guardian] 2017
 "Reclaim the Night", [monologue] in Snatches: Moments from 100 Years of Women's Lives: Eight Monologues, 2019

Awards and nominations

References

External links 
 
 Charlene James's CV
Charlene James talking about Tweet Tweet
Charlene James interview about playwriting

Living people
Year of birth missing (living people)
Place of birth missing (living people)
British dramatists and playwrights
British television writers
British science fiction writers
Black British women writers
English television writers
English screenwriters
British women television writers